Murajica Pajič (born August 24, 1961 in Jesenice, Yugoslavia) is a retired Slovenian ice hockey player.

Career

Club career
In 1977, he made his debut in the Yugoslav Ice Hockey League with HK Kranjska Gora, and joined HK Acroni Jesenice the following season. In 1986, Pajic joined HDD Olimpija Ljubljana for one season, before playing two years with KHL Medvescak from 1987-1989. Pajic returned to Jesenice for the 1989-90 season, and played for them until he retired in 1998.

International career
He represented both Yugoslavia and Slovenia in international competitions. Pajic played in six World Championships, and the Winter Olympics in 1984.

References

External links
 

1961 births
Living people
HDD Olimpija Ljubljana players
HK Acroni Jesenice players
Ice hockey players at the 1984 Winter Olympics
Olympic ice hockey players of Yugoslavia
Sportspeople from Jesenice, Jesenice
Slovenian ice hockey coaches
Slovenian ice hockey defencemen
Yugoslav ice hockey defencemen
Slovenian expatriate ice hockey people
Slovenian expatriate sportspeople in Italy
KHL Medveščak Zagreb players